Dioscorea bulbifera (commonly known as the air potato, air yam, bitter yam, cheeky yam, potato yam, aerial yam, and parsnip yam) is a species of true yam in the yam family, Dioscoreaceae. It is native to Africa, Asia and northern Australia. It is widely cultivated and has become naturalized in many regions (Latin America, the West Indies, the Southeastern United States, and various oceanic islands).

It is also known as the up-yam in Nigerian Pidgin English, since the plant is cultivated more for its bulbils than for its tubers.

Description

Dioscorea bulbifera is a perennial vine with broad, alternate leaves, and two types of storage organs.  The plant forms bulbils in the leaf axils of the twining stems, and tubers beneath the ground. These tubers are like small, oblong potatoes.  Some varieties are edible and cultivated as a food crop, especially in West Africa.  The tubers of edible varieties often have a bitter taste, which can be removed by boiling. They can then be prepared in the same way as other yams, potatoes, and sweet potatoes.

Air potato can grow extremely quickly, roughly 8 inches per day, and eventually reach over 60 ft long. It typically climbs to the tops of trees and has a tendency to take over native plants. New plants develop from bulbils that form on the plant, and these bulbils serve as a means of dispersal. The aerial stems of air potato die back in winter, but resprouting occurs from bulbils and underground tubers.

The primary means of spread and reproduction are by the bulbils. The smallest bulbils make control of air potato difficult due to their ability to sprout at a very small stage. The vine produces small white flowers; however, these are rarely seen when it grows in Florida. The fruits are capsules.

Uses
Air potato has been used as a folk remedy to treat conjunctivitis, diarrhoea, and dysentery, among other ailments.

D. bulbifera is highly important to the Tiwi people of Australia, who use it in an important ceremony called kulama. During the ceremony, the tubers are ritually cooked, and eaten on the third day.

Toxicity
Uncultivated forms, such as those found growing wild in Florida, can be poisonous. These varieties contain the steroid diosgenin, which is a principal material used in the manufacture of a number of synthetic steroidal hormones, such as those used in hormonal contraception.  There have been claims that even the wild forms are rendered edible after drying and boiling, leading to confusion over actual toxicity.

Invasive species
In some places, such as Florida, it is considered a noxious weed because of its quick-growing, large-leafed vine that spreads tenaciously and shades out any plants growing beneath it. The bulbils on the vines sprout and become new vines, twisting around each other to form a thick mat. If the plant is cut to the ground, the tubers can survive for extended periods and send up new shoots later.

The leaf beetle Lilioceris cheni has been studied and employed as an agent of biological pest control for the plant, with releases in 2012.

See also
Domesticated plants and animals of Austronesia
Yam production in Nigeria

References

Further reading
 Van Wyk, Ben-Erik (2005). Food Plants of the World. Portland, Oregon: Timber Press, Inc. 
 Dioscorea bulbifera.  University of Florida.

External links

 Species Profile - Air Potato (Dioscorea bulbifera), National Invasive Species Information Center, United States National Agricultural Library. Lists general information and resources for Air Potato.

bulbifera
Flora of Africa
Flora of Asia
Perennial vegetables
Flora of Christmas Island
Plants described in 1753
Taxa named by Carl Linnaeus
Yams (vegetable)